The Keeper is a 2004 thriller starring Dennis Hopper and Asia Argento. The film was produced by Peace Arch films for Showtime Network and was released in the UK theaters in 2004 and on DVD in the United States on March 28, 2006.

Plot
Deep within the soundproofed confines of his secluded country home, an upstanding police officer harbors a dark secret in director Paul Lynch's tense tale of unjust imprisonment and unhinged madness. On the surface, Lieutenant Krebs is a respected law enforcement officer with close ties to his community. A glance into Krebs' crippled psyche, however, reveals another, much more malevolent persona. Drifting exotic dancer named Gina has been brutally attacked in a near-fatal assault. Offered a ride to the local bus station by the outwardly amiable Lieutenant Krebs after issuing a statement to the local police force, Gina awakens to discover that she is being held captive in an escape-proof basement jail cell with all the discomforts of the county detention center. In the days and weeks that follow, world weary dancer Gina will be forced to wage mental warfare against her increasingly unstable captor if she ever hopes to escape the oppressive lockdown of his basement dungeon and live to tell the tale.

Cast
Dennis Hopper as Lieutenant Krebs
Asia Argento as Gina
Helen Shaver as Ruthie
Lochlyn Munro as Sgt. Burns
Charles Frederick as Joe Cody (Man in Black)
Alex Zahara as Derick

External links

References

2004 films
2004 thriller films
2000s English-language films
Films about kidnapping
Films directed by Paul Lynch
American thriller films
2000s American films